Walter of Château-Thierry  (died 1249) was a French theologian and scholastic philosopher. He became Bishop of Paris in the final year of his life.

He wrote on the various meanings of conscience. He was Chancellor of the University of Paris from 1246, and wrote critically of lazy students and money-minded teachers. His question on the office of preaching discusses the suitability of women, laymen, heretics, mendicants and sinners for preaching.

References
Henricus Weisweiler (1952, Quaestiones ineditae de Assumptione B. V. Mariae
 Ayelet Even-Ezra, “The Questio de officio predicacionis of Gauthier de Château Thierry: A Critical Edition,” Archives d'Histoire Doctrinale et Littéraire du Moyen-Âge 81 (2014), 385-462.

Notes

External links
 List of works

1249 deaths
13th-century French Catholic theologians
Bishops of Paris
Chancellors of the University of Paris
Year of birth unknown